Dilip Ray (born 9 January 1954) is an Indian politician and hotelier from the state of Odisha. He was formerly Union Minister of Steel, Coal and Parliamentary Affairs. Ray is the only Odia parliamentarian to be part of the Ministry of three Prime Ministers. He is the founder and CMD of Mayfair Group of Hotels, largely based in eastern India.

Early life

Ray was born on 9 January 1954 to Hrushikesh Ray and Kalyani Ray. He completed his matriculation in 1969 from Raj Kumar College, Raipur and graduated from St Joseph College, Darjeeling in 1974. Sri Ray then enrolled in JCC College of Law, Kolkata where he completed his law degree in 1976 and then completed his MBA from Academy of Management Science and Studies in 1977.

Political career

He started his political journey in 1985 when he was elected as the chairman of the then Rourkela Notified Council. In the same year he was elected as MLA from Rourkela Constituency (1985-90) and was re-elected again in the year 1990. He served as Minister of Industries in the Janata Dal Government (1990–95) which was headed by Biju Patnaik.

Ray was nominated to the upper house of Parliament, i.e., Rajya Sabha in 1996 and continued to be the member of the house for two consecutive terms (1996–2002; 2002–2008). As a parliamentarian, he held several  ministry portfolios and was a member of different parliamentary committees.

He also played a notable role in the foundation of the Biju Janata Dal. Ray considered Biju Patnaik his mentor and his closeness with him can  be gauged from the fact that Biju spent the last years of his life with him. During his last days, Biju Patnaik had expressed his desire to form a regional party for which he had consultations with several national leaders like Atal Bihari Vajpayee, Lal Krishna Advani, and Pramod Mahajan but could not effectuate it because of his untimely demise.

After the death of Biju Patnaik, Ray and other Janata Dal leaders founded Biju Janata Dal. When the party came into existence, Gyan Patnaik, wife of Biju Patnaik, insisted he take up the leadership of the party, but he declined to do so and requested someone from the family to take up the job.

He was also a sitting member of Odisha Legislative Assembly representing Rourkela Assembly constituency before he left politics in the year 2018.

A Special CBI court on 6 October 2020 convicted Dilip Ray, the then Union Minister of State for coal in the government under Atal Bihari Vajpayee in 1999, for his alleged involvement in the coal block allocation scandal.

Other information

A passionate traveler, Ray has traveled to over twenty countries across the globe and his other hobbies include interior decoration and gardening. He has a great cultural affinity. Promoting Odia culture and dialect has always been his esteemed priority which is evident from the fact that the 80% of the employees of the group founded by him are from Odisha.

The maxim of Mayfair Hotels and resorts which is “Stay with Us, Stay with Nature” reflects his commitment towards protecting the environment.

Positions held

1) Chairman, Rourkela Municipality

2) Member, Odisha Legislative Assembly (1985–1990)

3) Member, Odisha Legislative Assembly (1990–1995)

4) Minister of State, Industries (15/03/1990-24/07/1990)

5) Minister of State, Industries, excluding textiles and handlooms (24/07/1990 – 02/01/1991)

6) Minister, Industries, excluding textiles and handlooms (02/01/1991 – 15/03/1995)

7) Elected to Rajya Sabha (1996–2002)

8) Union MoS (I/C) of the Ministry of Animal Husbandry and Dairying

9) Union MoS (I/C) of the Ministry of Food Processing Industries

10) Union MoS (I/C) of the Ministry of Coal

11) Union MoS of Parliamentary Affairs

12) Union MoS of Ministry of Steel

13) Elected to Rajya Sabha for the second term (2002–2008)

14) Member, Consultative Committee for the Civil Aviation

15) Member, Committee on Labour and Welfare

16) Member Committee on Labour

17) Member, Odisha Legislative Assembly (2014-2019)

References

External links
 Profile on Rajya Sabha website
 Mayfair Hotels

1954 births
Rajya Sabha members from Odisha
People from Odisha
Living people
People from Sundergarh district
People from Rourkela
Bharatiya Janata Party politicians from Odisha
Biju Janata Dal politicians